Hristo Nikolov Lukov (6 January 1887 in Varna – 13 February 1943 in Sofia) was a Bulgarian lieutenant-general, politician, and Minister of War, who led the nationalistic Union of Bulgarian National Legions (UBNL), an organisation largely supportive of Nazi ideology. Lukov was assassinated in 1943 by two members of the Bulgarian resistance movement, Violeta Yakova and Ivan Burudzhiev.

Military and political career

First World War 
Hristo Nikolov Lukov was promoted during World War I to the rank of a major and a commander of an artillery battalion. Abroad he is incorrectly thought to be the commander of the 13th Infantry division during World War I. In fact, that was major-general Hristo Tsonev Lukov, a native of Gabrovo.

Interwar period 
During the interwar period Hristo Nikolov Lukov became the commander of the Army School of Artillery, of the Training Section of the General Staff's Artillery Inspection, and of the 2nd and 3rd Infantry divisions.

Between 1935–1938 Lukov served as Minister of War, in which position he created close ties to high-ranking Nazi officials.

Second World War 

During the Second World War he was a key supporter of the Axis powers, particularly Nazi Germany.
This was largely due to his close relations with the Third Reich and his activities as leader of UBNL. Lukov was considered one of the most prominent advocates of antisemitic ideas in Bulgaria.

Death 
Lukov was assassinated by Communist partisans on 13 February 1943 in Sofia. According to the book "In the name of the people", he was ambushed by two Jewish resistance fighters in front of his apartment in Sofia. Although struck by one bullet, he fought back one of the partisans, Ivan Burudzhiev, but the second one, Violeta Yakova, fired two more shots and killed him.

'Lukov March' 
From 2003 to 2019, the far-right Bulgarian National Union hosted an annual 'Lukov March' to commemorate “fallen heroes of Bulgaria” with a torch march, taking place in February in Sofia. It persistently caused controversy and was subject to multiple court bans. In 2020, the Supreme Administrative Court upheld a ban by the Sofia municipality so that the evening procession was cancelled. Less than 200 supporters of Lukov still gathered for the laying of wreaths at the house where Lukov was killed. Over one hundred people gathered for a counter-protest in central Sofia earlier in the day, promoting “No Nazis on the streets”.

Awards and decorations 
 Order of Bravery, 4th degree, first and second class
 Order of St Alexander, 3rd class without swords and 4th class with swords
 Order of Military Merit, 1st class
 Iron Cross of 1939, 2nd class (Germany)

See also 
 List of Bulgarian generals in the Kingdom of Bulgaria

Sources 
 Biographical Dictionary of the Extreme Right Since 1890 edited by Philip Rees, 1991,

References 

1887 births
1943 deaths
Politicians from Varna, Bulgaria
Bulgarian fascists
Bulgarian generals
Bulgarian anti-communists
Grand Crosses of the Order of Military Merit (Bulgaria)
Recipients of the Order of Bravery, 4th class
Recipients of the Iron Cross (1939), 2nd class
Bulgarian military personnel of the Balkan Wars
Bulgarian military personnel of World War I
Bulgarian collaborators with Nazi Germany
People murdered in Bulgaria
Assassinated Bulgarian politicians
20th-century Bulgarian politicians
Assassinated military personnel
Defence ministers of Bulgaria